Eurrhypis pollinalis is a species of moth of the family Crambidae. It was described by Michael Denis and Ignaz Schiffermüller in 1775.

Description
The wingspan is 28–33 mm. The forewings and hindwings are dark brown to almost black. On the forewing there are two large white spots. The hindwings show one white spot and a short streak, but they are smaller than the markings of the forewing. Both wings are lined with white on the outer edge. These moths fly in the sun during the day from April to August depending on the location, with two overlapping generations per year. They overwinter as a caterpillar.

The caterpillars feed on a restricted range of legumes (Fabaceae), such as broom (Genista), liquorice (Glycyrrhiza), Laburnum anagyroides, Cytisus scoparius and Ononis repens.

Distribution
This species is present in southern and central Europe.

Habitat
These moths prefer warm, sunny locations in open countryside. In the mountains they live up to an elevation of 1500 meters.

External links
 Fauna Europaea
 Lepidoptera of Belgium 
 Pyraustinae Keys

Eurrhypini
Moths of Europe
Moths of Asia